Carol McGregor is an Indigenous Australian artist of Wathaurung (Victoria) and Scottish descent, internationally known for her multi media installation pieces bringing together ephemeral natural fibres, metal, and paper. She is also deeply engaged in the creation of and cultural reconnection to possum skin cloaks, a traditional form of dress and important biographical cultural item.

Early life and education 
Carol McGregor was born in Hastings, New Zealand. After earning a Bachelor of Business Studies from Massey University in 1981, McGregor studied for a Bachelor of Contemporary Australian Indigenous Art (CAIA), Queensland College of Art (QCA), Griffith University, graduating in 2012. In 2013, McGregor earned a Bachelor of Fine Art with First Class Honours, from QCA. Between 2014 and 2017, she studied for a Doctor of Philosophy degree at QCA with an Australian Postgraduate Award Scholarship.

Career 
Carol McGregor aims through her practice to explore alternative forms of cultural expression and to adjust new technologies that would help her further examine the diversity of ancestry, experiences and intimate histories concealed within the landscape.

For her doctoral project, McGregor examined the material culture of possum skin cloaks in South East Queensland (SEQ). Thanks to her research work and the workshop she facilitated, the contemporary making of possum skin cloak was revitalised in SEQ communities.

McGregor collaborated with Glennys Briggs on the Art of the Skins (cloak making project and exhibition) presented at the State Library of Queensland in June – Nov 2016.

McGregor's work in cast silver, Cornerstone (2011–18), was featured by the Griffith University Art Museum, Brisbane, as part of the Boundary Lines group exhibition in November 2018 – February 2019.

McGregor's latest work Skin Country (2018) was featured by the Institute of Modern Art, Brisbane, as part of The Commute exhibition in September – December 2018.

Work

Solo exhibitions 
2014 IDALIA imprints – The Webb Gallery, Qld College of Art (response to artist residency with The University of Queensland's School of Biological Sciences)
2015 Idalia HAAS Library, University of Qld, Brisbane
2018 Carol McGregor: Repositories of Recognition, Kluge-Ruhe Aboriginal Art Collection, University of Virginia

Major exhibitions 
2009 Postcard Art & Advertising (CAIA, QCA) Cairns Indigenous Art Fair, Cairns
2010 On Paper, Impress Printmakers and Qld College of Art Print Club, Brisbane
2010 Cairns Indigenous Art Fair, Cairns
2010 Our Stories, Our Way, Mater Hospital, Brisbane
2010 Art from the Soul, Kurilpa Gallery, Brisbane
2011 Knots, Contemporary Artisans Collective Gallery, Brisbane
2012 First, Emerging Indigenous Art, Love Love Studio, Brisbane
2013 Artoriginal, Brisbane Town Hall
2013 Middle Ground, Fine Art Honours students, The Hold Artspace, Brisbane
2013 Field, Contemporary Landscapes, The Hold Artspace, Brisbane
2014 The Gather Award, St. Ita's, Brisbane
2014 Intimate Spaces Revealed, Canberra Contemporary Art Space, Canberra
2015 Art meets Science, Queensland Academy of Arts and Science, Brisbane
2015 My Story, The Gold Coast Arts Centre, Gold Coast.
2015 Blak, Art from the Margins, St Andrews Hospital, Brisbane
2015 Warriors, Sorcerers and Spirits, KickArts Contemporary Arts, Cairns indigenous Art Fair, Cairns
2015 Reconciliation Week, Judith Wright Centre, Brisbane
2016 Art of the Skins, State Library Queensland, Brisbane
2016 Gathering Strands, Redland Art Gallery, Cleveland
2017 Tastes Like Sunshine, Museum of Brisbane, Queensland
2018, So Fine: Contemporary women artists make Australian history, National Portrait Gallery, Canberra
2018, Boundary Lines, Griffith University Art Museum, Brisbane
2018 The Commute, Institute of Modern Art, Brisbane

Selected award exhibitions 
2013 The churchie national emerging art prize, Griffith University Art Gallery (GUAG), Brisbane
2013 Sunshine Coast Art Prize, 3D – Finalist, Noosa Regional Gallery
2013 15 Artists 2013, Moreton Bay Regional Council, Redcliffe Art Gallery
2014 The churchie national emerging art prize, GUAG, Brisbane
 2014 Redlands Konica Minolta Art Prize

Awards and nominations 
2014 Winner, The Inaugural Gather Award, Brisbane
2015 1854 Scholar, Museum Victoria, Melbourne

Collections 
 Kluge-Ruhe Aboriginal Art Collection, University of Virginia
 Redland Art Gallery, Queensland

References

External links 
 Carol McGregor's webpage
 Collection of Carol McGregor's works

Created via preloaddraft
Indigenous Australian artists
Living people
1961 births
People from Hastings, New Zealand
Massey University alumni
Queensland College of Art alumni